Choudhri Mohammed Naim (born 3 June 1936) is an American scholar of Urdu language and literature. He is currently professor emeritus at the University of Chicago.

Naim is the founding editor of both Annual of Urdu Studies and Mahfil (now Journal of South Asian Literature), as well as the author of the definitive textbook for Urdu pedagogy in English.

Biography
Naim was born in Barabanki, India, and educated at Lucknow University, Lucknow, Deccan College, Poona, and the University of California, Berkeley. In 1961, he joined the faculty of the Department of South Asian Languages and Civilizations at the University of Chicago, which he chaired from 1985 to 1991. He retired in 2001. He was a national fellow at the Indian Institute of Advanced Study, Shimla, in 2009, and a visiting professor at the Jamia Millia Islamia, New Delhi, in 2003.

Bibliography

Urdu Reader (with John Gumperz). Berkeley: Center for South Asia Studies, University of California (1960).
Conversational Hindi-Urdu, 2 vols. (with John Gumperz, June Romery and A. B. Singh). Berkeley: ASUC Store, University of California (1963).
Readings in Urdu: Prose and Poetry. Honolulu: East-West Center Press, for the South Asia Language and Area Center, University of Hawaii (1965).
Iqbal, Jinnah and Pakistan: The Vision and the Reality. Ed. by C. M. Naim. Syracuse: Maxwell School of Citizenship and Public Affairs, Syracuse University (1979).
Curfew in the City: Novella by Vibhuti Narain Rai (translated from Hindi), New Delhi: Roli Books (1998).
Zikr-i Mir: The Autobiography of the Eighteenth Century Mughal Poet Mir Muhammad Taqi 'Mir'. (translated from the Persian, with annotation and introduction). New Delhi: Oxford University Press (1999).
Ambiguities of Heritage: Fictions and Polemics. Karachi: City Books (1999).  Available at Ambiguities of Heritage (1999), by C. M. Naim
A Season of Betrayals: A Short Story and Two Novellas by Qurratulain Hyder (translated from Urdu). New Delhi: Kali for Women, 1999.)
Introductory Urdu, 2 vols. Chicago: Committee on Southern Asian Studies, University of Chicago, 1975.  Revised edition, 1980. Third revised edition, Chicago 1999. Also published, New Delhi: Council for the Promotion of Urdu Language (2000).
Inspector Matadeen on the Moon: selected satires of Harishankar Parsai (translated from Hindi). New Delhi: Katha (2003).
Urdu Texts and Contexts: The Selected Essays of C. M. Naim. New Delhi: Permanent Black (2004).
A Killing in Ferozewala: Essays / Polemics / Reviews. Karachi: City Press (2013).
The Muslim League in Barabanki: Essays / Polemics. Karachi: City Press (2013).
The Hijab and I: Essays/Polemics/Reviews. Karachi: City Press (2015)
Mir Taqi Mir: Remembrances. Edited and translated by C. M. Naim. (Murty Classical Library of India) Cambridge: Harvard University Press (2019)
A Most Noble Life: The Biography of Ashraffunnisa Begum (1877—1903). Edited and translated by C. M. Naim. New Delhi: Orient Blackswan, 2022.

References

External links
 A Full Bibliography of C. M. Naim
An online collection of C.M. Naim's essays
Getting Real about Christian-Muslim Dialogue  - Luther Seminary
Audio/Video recordings of C. M. Naim moderating a panel discussion on "Traveling Between Two Worlds: The Public Intellectual in South Asian Scholarship" at the University of Chicago
Audio/Video recording of C. M. Naim's talk at the Symposium: One Hundred Years of All-India Muslim League - Keynote Address: "A Sentimental Essay in Three Scenes - With An Epilogue" at the University of Chicago.

1936 births
Indian emigrants to the United States
University of California, Berkeley alumni
American male writers of Indian descent
People from Barabanki, Uttar Pradesh
American Muslims
University of Chicago faculty
Living people
Urdu-language writers
American academics of Indian descent
Indian scholars